Michael Friedman may refer to:

 Mike Friedman (American football) (fl. 1962–1983), American football coach
 Michael Friedman (philosopher) (born 1947), American philosopher of science
 Michael Jan Friedman (born 1955), American author
 Michael Friedman (author, born 1960) (1960–2020), American author, poet, editor and publisher
 Michael Friedman (composer) (1975–2017), American composer and lyricist
 Mike Friedman (born 1982), American cyclist
 Michael Friedman, president of Purdue Pharma
 Michael Friedman (photographer), music publicist, artist manager, music producer and amateur photographer

See also
 Michael Freedman (disambiguation)
 Michael Freeman (disambiguation)